Brian Baker (born February 25, 1965) is an American punk rock musician. He is best known as one of the founding members of the hardcore punk band Minor Threat, and as a guitarist in Bad Religion since 1994. In Minor Threat, he originally played bass guitar before switching to guitar in 1982 when Steve Hansgen joined the band, and then moved back to bass after Hansgen's departure. He also founded Dag Nasty in 1985, was part of the original line-up of Samhain, and has had stints in Doggy Style, The Meatmen (with fellow Minor Threat member Lyle Preslar), Government Issue, and Junkyard (a hard rock band).

In 1994 Baker was offered a spot as a touring musician with R.E.M. but declined, opting instead to accept a position in Bad Religion as Brett Gurewitz's replacement.  He also experimented with a more pop direction influenced by U2, with a band called 400. Baker briefly toured with Me First and the Gimme Gimmes in 2005 and appeared on Canadian punk band Penelope's second album (Face au silence du monde). He has been a frequent guest guitarist on many songs and albums by artists as varied as Blood Bats, Tesco Vee, Ric Ocasek, Teenage Time Killers, Mind Over Four, Dangerous Toys, Pollen Art, Unwritten Law, Travis Cut, Lickity Split, Hot Water Music, Down By Law, Bash & Pop, Middle Aged Brigade, Careless, and many others.

The supergroup Foxhall Stacks, composed of Baker, Bill Barbot (Jawbox), Peter Moffett (Burning Airlines, Government Issue), and Jim Spellman (High Back Chairs, Velocity Girl) released their debut album, The Coming Collapse, in 2019. Another supergroup, Fake Names, formed with vocalist Dennis Lyxzén (Refused, The (International) Noise Conspiracy, INVSN), guitarist Michael Hampton (S.O.A., Embrace, One Last Wish), bassist Johnny Temple (Girls Against Boys, Soulside), and drummer Matt Schulz (Enon, Lab Partners, Holy Fuck), began touring in 2018 and released a self-titled debut album in 2020.

Discography

Bad Religion
 The Gray Race (1996)
 Tested (1997)
 No Substance (1998)
 The New America (2000)
 The Process of Belief (2002)
 The Empire Strikes First (2004)
 New Maps of Hell (2007)
 The Dissent of Man (2010)
 True North (2013)
 Age of Unreason (2019)

Doggy Style
 The Last Laugh (1986)

Dag Nasty
 Can I Say (1986)
 Wig Out at Denko's (1987)
 All Ages Show 7" (1987)
 Field Day (1988)
 Trouble Is 12" (1988)
 85-86 (1991)
 Four on the Floor (1992)
 Minority of One (2002)
 Dag with Shawn (2010)
 Cold Heart 7" (2016)

The Meatmen
 War of the Superbikes (1984)

Government Issue
 Make an Effort EP (1982)

Minor Threat
 Minor Threat EP (1981)
 In My Eyes EP (1981)
 Out of Step (1983)
 Salad Days EP (1985)

Junkyard
 Junkyard (1989)
 Sixes, Sevens & Nines (1991)
 Shut Up – We're Trying to Practice! (2000)
 Tried and True (2003)
 Faded/The River 7" (2015)
 High Water (2017)
 Old Habits Die Hard (2019)

Foxhall Stacks
 The Coming Collapse (2019)

Beach Rats
 Wasted Time 7" (2018)
 Rat Beat (2022)

Fake Names
 Fake Names (2020)
 Fake Names EP (2021)

Further reading

References

1965 births
Living people
American rock guitarists
American male guitarists
American rock bass guitarists
American male bass guitarists
Bad Religion members
Place of birth missing (living people)
American punk rock guitarists
Guitarists from Michigan
Minor Threat members
Dag Nasty members
The Meatmen members
20th-century American guitarists
21st-century American guitarists
Government Issue members